Witnesses is a French police procedural television series, created by Marc Herpoux and Hervé Hadmar, that premiered in Belgium on La Une on 22 November 2014. Set in the coastal town of Le Tréport in Normandy, France, police detectives Sandra Winckler (Marie Dompnier) and Justin (Jan Hammenecker) investigate when bodies of murder victims are unearthed and left for discovery in the show homes of a housing developer. Former chief-of-police, Paul Maisonneuve (Thierry Lhermitte), is implicated. This series was later broadcast in France on France 2 from 8 March 2015, and from 1 May 2015 Netflix began streaming a subtitled version in the United States. Channel 4 broadcast the series in the United Kingdom from 22 July 2015.

Marie Dompnier won a Golden FIPA award for the best actress in a television series at 2015's Biarritz International Festival of Audiovisual Programming for her role as Sandra Winckler. In March 2016, France 2 announced a second series was in production. This series premiered in France on 15 March 2017. Sandra and Justin find themselves on the trail of a serial killer whose modus operandi is to murder all former lovers of his kidnap victims. Audrey Fleurot and Judith Henry joined the cast. In the UK, this series was  broadcast on BBC Four from 25 November 2017.

Cast
 Marie Dompnier as Sandra Winckler
 Jan Hammenecker as Justin  
 Alexandre Carrière as Fred
 Florence Bolufer as Melanie

Series 1
 Thierry Lhermitte as Paul Maisonneuve 
 Laurent Lucas as Kaz Gorbier 
 Catherine Mouchet as Maxine "Max" Dubreuil 
 Roxane Duran as Laura 
 Mehdi Nebbou as Eric 
 Frédéric Bouraly as Philippe
 Thomas Doret as Jérémie Gorbier
 Laurent Delbecque as Thomas Maisonneuve

Series 2
 Audrey Fleurot as Catherine Keemer 
 Judith Henry as Maxine 
 Steve Driesen as Oliver Keemer 
 Yannick Choirat as Geir Jansen 
 Guillaume Durieux as Eric Winckler 
 Anne Benoît as Christiane Varène 
 Philip Desmeules as Antoine Barrier 
 Dominique Bettenfeld as Martin Souriau

Episodes

Series 1 (2015)

Series 2 (2017)

References

External links
 
 
 Les Témoins on France 2

2015 French television series debuts
French-language television shows
Detective television series
La Une original programming